Pius X High School can refer to:

St. Pius X Catholic High School (DeKalb County, Georgia)
Pius X High School (Nebraska) in Lincoln, Nebraska
Pius X High School (Pennsylvania) in Bangor, Pennsylvania
Pius X High School (Downey, California) formerly in Downey, California